Manolito may refer to:

Manuel "Manolito" Goreiro, character in the Mafalda universe
Manolito Gafotas, star of children's books by Spanish author Elvira Lindo
Manolito Montoya, a character on the US TV series The High Chaparral
Manolito y su Trabuco, a Cuban salsa band

See also

Spanish masculine given names
Informal personal names